The Haskell Free Library and Opera House is a Victorian building that straddles the Canada–United States border, in Rock Island (now part of Stanstead), Quebec and Derby Line, Vermont, respectively. The Opera House opened on June 7, 1904, having deliberately been built on the international border. It was declared a heritage building by both countries in the 1970s and 1980s.

The library has two different addresses: 93 Caswell Avenue, Derby Line, Vermont, and 1 rue Church (Church Street), Stanstead, Quebec.

Overview
The library collection and the opera stage are located in Stanstead, but the main entrance and most opera seats are located in Derby Line. Because of this, the Haskell is sometimes called "the only library in the U.S.A. with no books" and "the only opera house in the U.S.A. with no stage". There is no entrance from Canada; however, there is an emergency exit on the Canadian side of the building. All patrons and visitors must use the U.S. entrance to access the building. Patrons from Canada are permitted to enter the United States door without needing to report to customs by using a prescribed route through the sidewalk of rue Church (Church Street), provided that they return to Canada immediately upon leaving the building using the same route.

A thick black line runs beneath the seats of the opera house and diagonally across the center of the library's reading room to mark the Canada–United States border. The stage and half of the seats are in Canada; the remainder of the opera hall is in the US. The building has different postal codes (93 Caswell Avenue, 05830 and 1, rue Church (Church Street), J0B 3E2) and different telephone area codes (+1-802-873-3022 and +1-819-876-2471) in its two respective countries.

The library has a collection of more than 20,000 books in French and English and is open to the public 38 hours a week.

The building is recognized as a historic site in both countries.  In the United States, it has been registered in the National Register of Historic Places since 1976.  In Canada, it was designated a National Historic Site in 1985 and has been a provincial heritage site since 1977.

Following the Trump travel ban, the library served as a site for international reunions, as it is partly in Canada and partly in the United States.

History

The Haskell Free Library and Opera House was a gift from Martha Stewart Haskell and her son Horace "Stewart" Haskell. It was built in memory of her parents Catherine and Horace Stewart and her husband Carlos Freeman Haskell. The Haskells wanted Canadians and Americans to have equal access to the Library and Opera House and so they chose to build on the border. Construction began in 1901 and the Opera House opened in 1904 and the Library in 1905.

The opera house on the second floor was rumored to be modeled after the old Boston Opera House in a somewhat scaled down fashion (it seats four hundred), but the Boston Opera house was built afterwards. A painted scene of Venice on the drop curtain and 4 other scenes by Erwin Lamoss (1901) and plaster scrollwork complete with plump cherubs built in Boston ornament the opera hall and balcony in this historic building, which was constructed with  walls built of granite from Stanstead.

The Haskell family later donated the building to the towns of Derby Line and Rock Island in Haskell's memory; it is run by a private international board of four American and three Canadian directors.

Organization
French and English books are co-filed. Because of different language conventions in the direction of printing titles on spines—American English books have titles written top-to-bottom, and French books bottom-to-top—the language of a book can be immediately determined.

See also

 Baarle-Nassau and Baarle-Hertog, two communities with a complicated borderline between The Netherlands and Belgium.
 Collins–Valentine line – the boundary between Quebec and the states of Vermont and New York, surveyed in the early 1770s.
 Estcourt Station, Maine (population 4) and Estcourt, Quebec
 La Cure, a village divided between Switzerland and France; one hotel is bisected by the boundary, as are at least two residences and a pub.
 Line house – a building that straddles an international boundary.
 List of historic places in Estrie
 List of National Historic Sites of Canada in Quebec
 National Register of Historic Places listings in Orleans County, Vermont
 Paul VI Audience Hall in Rome lies partially in the Vatican City but mostly in Italy: the Italian part of the building is treated as an extraterritorial area of the Holy See and is used by the Pope as an alternative to Saint Peter's Square when conducting his Wednesday morning General Audience
 Transnational marriage

References

External links

 
 
 History of the Library on its official web site

1904 establishments in Quebec
1904 establishments in Vermont
Buildings and structures in Derby, Vermont
Buildings and structures in Estrie
Canada–United States border
Education in Estrie
Event venues on the National Register of Historic Places in Vermont
Heritage buildings of Quebec
Libraries in Quebec
Libraries in Vermont
Libraries on the National Register of Historic Places in Vermont
Music venues completed in 1904
Music venues in Quebec
National Historic Sites in Quebec
National Register of Historic Places in Orleans County, Vermont
Opera houses in Canada
Opera houses in Vermont
Opera houses on the National Register of Historic Places
Public libraries in Vermont
Queen Anne architecture in Canada
Queen Anne architecture in Vermont
Stanstead, Quebec
Theatres completed in 1904
Theatres on the National Register of Historic Places in Vermont
Tourist attractions in Estrie
Vermont culture